Sharon Teterai (born 10 April 2000) is a Zimbabwean footballer who plays as a defender. She has been a member of the Zimbabwe women's national team.

Club career
Teterai played for Black Rhinos in Zimbabwe.

International career
Teterai capped for Zimbabwe at senior level during  the 2020 COSAFA Women's Championship.

References

2000 births
Living people
Zimbabwean women's footballers
Women's association football defenders
Zimbabwe women's international footballers